The Cape Foulwind Railway was a branch railway line west of Westport to Cape Foulwind. In 1886 the Westport Harbour Board built the line to their quarry to transport rocks to their breakwaters in the Buller River. In 1888 it was linked to Westport by a road-rail bridge over the Buller River. By 1888 it was said to be carrying a considerable passenger traffic, using two coaches. In 1914 a new section of line including a tunnel was built to a new quarry south of the Cape.

In 1921 the line and the three F class locomotives were transferred to the New Zealand Railways. The branch was one of the branch lines closed by the Railway Commission in 1930, although it had been effectively closed from about 1925. But in 1931 the line reverted to the Marine Department, which ran occasional trains until about 1940. In 1958, a new cement works opened at Cape Foulwind.

The original Buller bridge was replaced in 1976 by a concrete bridge, slightly upstream.

Cape Foulwind

Originally the site of a Māori village named Omau, Cape Foulwind has a lighthouse, and a former cement works. Built since the line closed, the cement was trucked from the works to a private siding just south of Westport. The cement works closed in 2016. The name Omau has been reinstated as a proper place name.

External links
Photo of Cape Foulwind Junction
Photo of a wayside station on the branch
Photo of Buller Bridge

References

Citations

Bibliography

 
 

West Coast, New Zealand
Railway lines in New Zealand
Rail transport in the West Coast, New Zealand
Railway lines opened in 1886
Railway lines closed in 1930
Closed railway lines in New Zealand